, provisional designation , is a background asteroid from the central region of the asteroid belt, approximately  in diameter. It was discovered on 16 January 1988, by Japanese amateur astronomer Takuo Kojima at the YGCO Chiyoda Station in the Kantō region of Japan. The asteroid has a rotation period of 6.5 hours.

Classification and orbit 

 is non-family asteroid of the main belt's background population. It orbits the Sun in the central asteroid belt at a distance of 2.1–3.3 AU once every 4 years and 5 months (1,602 days; semi-major axis of 2.68 AU). Its orbit has an eccentricity of 0.23 and an inclination of 13° with respect to the ecliptic.

Naming 

As of 2018,  remains unnamed.

Physical characteristics

Lightcurves 

Lightcurve analysis gave a rotation period of  hours with a brightness variation of 0.30 in magnitude. A previous 2006-observation by American astronomer Brian Warner at his Palmer Divide Observatory in Colorado gave a period of  hours and an amplitude of 0.24 magnitude.

Diameter and albedo 

According to the surveys carried out by the Japanese Akari satellite and the NEOWISE mission of 
NASA's Wide-field Infrared Survey Explorer, the asteroid has a low albedo of between 0.048 and 0.08, with a diameter between 12.04 and 17.27 kilometers.

Despite the results from the space-based observations, the Collaborative Asteroid Lightcurve Link assumes a higher albedo of 0.10 – a compromise between the stony and carbonaceous asteroid populations from the inner and outer main-belt, respectively – and hence calculates a smaller diameter of 12.1 kilometers with an absolute magnitude of 12.7.

References

External links 
 Lightcurve plot of (7563) 1988 BC, Palmer Divide Observatory, B. D. Warner (2006)
 Asteroid Lightcurve Database (LCDB), query form (info )
 Dictionary of Minor Planet Names, Google books
 Asteroids and comets rotation curves, CdR – Observatoire de Genève, Raoul Behrend
 Discovery Circumstances: Numbered Minor Planets (5001)-(10000) – Minor Planet Center
 
 

007563
Discoveries by Takuo Kojima
19880116